Marcel Lucien Charles Van Crombrugge (13 September 1880 – 23 September 1940) was a Belgian rower who competed in the 1900 Summer Olympics. He was part of the Belgian boat Royal Club Nautique de Gand, which won the silver medal in the men's eight.

References

External links

 profile

1880 births
1940 deaths
Belgian male rowers
Olympic rowers of Belgium
Rowers at the 1900 Summer Olympics
Olympic silver medalists for Belgium
Flemish sportspeople
Olympic medalists in rowing
Medalists at the 1900 Summer Olympics
European Rowing Championships medalists
20th-century Belgian people
Royal Club Nautique de Gand rowers